There are two lists of Minnesota trees organized in distinct ways:

 List of Minnesota trees by family
 List of Minnesota trees by scientific name